José de Oliveira can refer to:
José Alberto de Oliveira Anchieta (1832–1897), Portuguese explorer and naturalist
José Luiz de Oliveira (born 1904), Brazilian footballer
José Freire de Oliveira Neto (1928–2012), Brazilian Catholic bishop
José Ribamar de Oliveira (1932–1974), Brazilian footballer
Zé Olívio (José Olivio Miranda Oliveira, 1947-2008), Brazilian trade unionist
José Aparecido de Oliveira, Brazilian politician, minister of Culture (Brazil) 1985 and 1988–1990
José Carlos de Oliveira, Brazilian runner in 1995 South American Championships in Athletics and 1999 IAAF World Cross Country Championships – Men's short race
José Roberto de Oliveira (born 1980), Brazilian footballer
Márcio José de Oliveira (born 1984), Brazilian footballer
José Jefferson Rodrigues de Oliveira (born 1985), Brazilian footballer
Paulinho (footballer, born April 1986), Brazilian footballer, full name Paulo José de Oliveira
José Rogério de Oliveira Melo (born 1990), Brazilian footballer

See also 
Éder Bonfim (Éder José de Oliveira Bonfim, born 1981), Brazilian footballer
Baltemar Brito (Baltemar José de Oliveira, born 1952), Brazilian footballer
José Dirceu (José Dirceu de Oliveira e Silva, born 1946), Brazilian politician
Alex Fraga (Alex José de Oliveira Fraga, born 1986), Brazilian footballer
Anderson Lessa (José Anderson de Oliveira Lessa, born 1989), Brazilian footballer
Zezé Motta (Maria José Motta de Oliveira, born 1944), Brazilian actress and singer
Alexandre José Oliveira (Alexandre José de Oliveira Albuquerque, born 1977), Brazilian footballer
Cássio Oliveira (Cássio José de Abreu Oliveira, born 1980), Brazilian footballer
Juca de Oliveira (José de Oliveira Santos, born 1935), Brazilian actor
Zezé Perrella (José Perrella de Oliveira Costa, born 1956), Brazilian footballer
Tibi (Portuguese footballer) (António José de Oliveira Meireles, born 1951), Brazilian footballer